(Tekken: Dark Resurrection for the PSP version) is a fighting video game and a standalone update to the PlayStation 2 game Tekken 5. The arcade version was released in Japan in December 2005 and later worldwide in February of 2006, while the PSP version was released as a home version of the Tekken series later that year in July 2006. The game was also released as a downloadable game on the PlayStation 3 via the PlayStation Network online service in Japan in 2006 and the rest of the world in 2007. A sequel, Tekken 6 was released in 2007.

Plot
As an update, the same story as Tekken 5 is featured, with the addition of three new characters. Emilie de Rochefort seeks to destroy the Mishima Zaibatsu and end her father's financial problems. Sergei Dragunov is a member of Spetsnaz who has been ordered to capture Jin Kazama. Finally Armor King II, the brother of the original Armor King who seeks revenge on Craig Marduk for his brother's death.

Differences from previous versions
Along with the many additions to the PlayStation 2 version of Tekken 5, the Arcade Battle has been upgraded by adding twelve more ranking titles and removing one: Conqueror. Tekken Lord is no longer the highest ranking like it was in Tekken 5. Dark Lord is one ranking above Tekken Lord and the highest ranking is Divine Fist.

Divine Fist is only achieved by successfully completing all of the league matches, survival tournaments and ranking tournaments in Tekken Dojo mode. The opportunity is offered once a promotion chance is offered sometime in the Heaven Dojo, the sixth stage in Tekken Dojo mode. Obviously it is only offered when the player is ranked as a Dark Lord. In the European PSP version, the player's current character will be promoted from Dark Lord to Divine Fist, once they have completed all dojos, including the challenges, and then win the Heaven Dojo ranking tournament once again.

Another addition to Arcade Battle is that it now keeps track of the player's statistics. Each character has a clean slate once they begin playing Arcade Battle. While selecting a character, loading a match and battling an opponent, the player can see their alias, ranking, what region they hail from, their wins, losses and percentage.

Dark Resurrection also rebalanced the game from the original PlayStation 2 version. There were new moves added for certain characters along with other moves that appeared to be overpowered in the previous version were rebalanced. Other changes included completing moves that looked incomplete in the previous version and changing the speed of certain attacks.

Dark Resurrection also provided more tools for the players to customize their characters. The default colors for most of the characters were different from the original version of the game, despite the characters being shown in most of the FMVs and artwork of the PSP version in their original colors. For example, Paul's red dojo uniform became white, Kuma's brown fur became white making him look like a polar bear, and Jinpachi Mishima now appeared to be covered in flames. None of these changes were absolute, since the player could customize the characters back to their original colors, with the exception of Jinpachi, who is not playable in the PSP version.

Dark Resurrection also includes several new stages. Some of the new stages are actually modified versions of the originals, that contained different textures, details, and remixed versions of the original music. For example, the flaming temple of the original game now appeared a normal temple in daylight and the church of the original appeared as a snowy castle.

Ports

PSP version
The PSP version runs at full 60 FPS during matches (although it reverts to around 30 frame/s for the pre-fight and post-fight cinematics). The game features game sharing, which means that only one copy of the game is needed to play over ad hoc. The game runs on version 2.6 firmware for the North American version, and the European version requires version 2.71.

Other modes include Tekken Dojo, where players are able to fight ghosts of other players that can be uploaded and downloaded online. They can also download official ghost packs from arcades all over the world.
In Gold Rush mode, the player fights for in-game cash. New versions of Tekken Bowl and Command Attack; bonus games from Tekken Tag Tournament and Tekken 4, are also included.

Due to the PSP d-pad's lack of protrusion, Namco produced a special d-pad attachment that sits on top of the PSP's d-pad that came with early releases of the Japanese and Asian versions of the game, as well as pre-ordered copies of the US version. The European version did not include this accessory.

The PSP version forgoes the original stages and music present in the arcade version (save for Final Battle 2 stage and its respective theme) and only features the new variations and music added in the Dark Resurrection update. It does contain all of the unique stages from the arcade game, however. It also had cropped versions of the ending movies for all of the characters from Tekken 5.

Tekken: Dark Resurrection charted 5th on the list of the best selling games for July–August for 2006. As of July 26, 2009, the game has sold over 2.2 million copies.

PS3 version
Although Tekken: Dark Resurrection had positive reviews and sales, it had disappointed many of the hardcore Tekken players that the game was not available on a PlayStation home console, as all the previous installments had been. As handhelds cannot be taken to the same competitive level as a home console, Namco Bandai announced that the game would be ported to the PlayStation 3. The game retained the numeric title of the Arcade version, unlike the PSP version. This version has both the Tekken 5 and Tekken 5: Dark Resurrection stages and music present. However, the one stage that was present from Tekken 5 in Tekken: Dark Resurrection for the PSP (Final Battle 2) is actually absent in this version. The Space Colony's BGM "The Center of Gravity" is also absent and the original song "Orbital Move" is present in its place.

Tekken 5: Dark Resurrection was first made available on the Japanese PlayStation Store on December 12, 2006. At $16, it made Dark Resurrection the most expensive game available for download. The North American version was made available on March 1, 2007, for $19.99, while the European version was released on March 23, 2007, in conjunction with the PAL launch for GBP 6.99/EUR 9.99. It is also available at the Singapore PlayStation Store for S$24.99 (US$1 = approximately S$1.55).

While the PSP version is a visually scaled down version of the Arcade build, the PS3 version retains its original graphical performance, running at 60 frames per second, and supports full 1080p HD resolution. The game features the same modes as the Arcade version, including Ghost Battle and Gallery, while Jinpachi Mishima is playable for the first time. Initially however, unlike its PSP counterpart, the PlayStation 3 version lacked several additional gameplay modes from Tekken 5 (PS2) and Tekken: Dark Resurrection (PSP), including Story and Bonus.

On June 25, 2007, Namco announced an update entitled Tekken 5: Dark Resurrection Online. The update included an Online Versus mode, as well as Online Rankings, marking the first official Tekken to be playable online. A Practice and Survival mode was also added along with the aforementioned features. The update was released on the Japanese store on August 1, 2007 and on the North American store on August 30, 2007. The update for Europe was released on November 8, 2007. In a GamePro article titled The 24 greatest PlayStation 3 games revealed, Tekken 5: Dark Resurrection Online was ranked number 12. The article said, "Tekken 5: Dark Resurrection Online is the pinnacle edition of Namco's fighter - it's the definitive version of the classic fighter available as an inexpensive PSN download. The massive 30+ character roster features a mix of characters old (Eddy Gordo, Marshall Law) and new (Sergei Dragunov, Lili). The 1080-enabled graphics look sharp, but where Tekken 5: Dark Resurrection really shines is in its new Online mode, which features a sleek matchmaking interface and a large community of active players."

Characters

Being the update of Tekken 5, Dark Resurrection features the return of all 32 playable characters from that game while adding four new ones. Eddy Gordo, a palette swap of Christie Monteiro in the original Tekken 5, has been given his own character slot and customization template. While he is still unplayable in the arcade and PSP port, the PS3 version of the game makes Jinpachi Mishima into a playable character for the first time in the series. He can be accessed by clearing Arcade Mode once.

New characters
Armor King II: The former trainer of King II who mysteriously appears after being thought to had been killed by Craig Marduk, but in later games revealed to be his younger brother, Armor King II, who seeks revenge against Marduk for killing his older brother.
Lili: A Monégasque teenager practicing Street Fighting who participates in the tournament to take down Mishima Zaibatsu so she will be able to put an end to her father's financial problems. Her full name is "Emilie De Rochefort".
Sergei Dragunov: A member of Russian Spetsnaz practicing Sambo who is sent to capture one of the bearers of Devil Gene, such as primarily Jin Kazama.

Returning characters

Anna Williams
Asuka Kazama
Baek Doo San
Bruce Irvin
Bryan Fury
Christie Monteiro

Craig Marduk
Devil Jin
Eddy Gordo
Feng Wei
Ganryu
Heihachi Mishima

Hwoarang
Jack-5
Jin Kazama
Jinpachi Mishima  
Julia Chang
Kazuya Mishima

King II
Kuma II
Lee Chaolan
Lei Wulong
Ling Xiaoyu
Marshall Law

Mokujin
Nina Williams
Panda 
Paul Phoenix
Raven
Roger Jr.

Steve Fox
Wang Jinrei
Yoshimitsu

 Unlockable in PlayStation 3 Version
 Unplayable in Arcade and PlayStation Portable Version
 Skin/palette swap

Reception

Reviews

Critical response to Tekken: Dark Resurrection has been overall very positive. GamesRadar claims it to be the single best portable fighting game ever.

The PlayStation 3 version was also well received. Critics praised the updated graphics and being able to play online, but criticized the lack of modes the PSP version featured and lag while playing online.

Notes

References

External links
Tekken: Dark Resurrection Official website  
Tekken 5: Dark Resurrection Online Official website 

2005 video games
Eighting games
Arcade video games
Fighting games used at the Super Battle Opera tournament
PlayStation 3 games
PlayStation Network games
Fighting games
PlayStation Portable games
Fighting games used at the Evolution Championship Series tournament
Tekken games
Video game remakes
Video game sequels
Video games developed in Japan
Video games scored by Go Shiina
Video games scored by Keiichi Okabe
Video games scored by Satoru Kōsaki
Video games scored by Yuu Miyake
Video games set in Tokyo
Video games set in Seoul
Video games set in Scotland
Video games set in China
Video games set in outer space
Video games set in Antarctica
Video games set in the United States
Video games set in Russia
Video games set in Monaco
Video games set in Canada
Multiplayer and single-player video games

pl:Tekken 5: Dark Resurrection